Jang Nam-Seok (born 18 April 1983) is a South Korean former football forward.

Club career 
In 2006, Jang made his professional debut with Daegu FC, and finished as the top scorer in the Korean FA Cup that year. In 2008, Jang Nam-Seok, together with Lee Keun-Ho and Eninho, played a key role in the offense orientated tactics that was employed by Daegu FC that season.  On 6 June 2008, he scored a goal within 40 seconds of kickoff in a home match against Ulsan Hyundai Horang-i.  This set a 2008 season record for the quickest goal scored in a K-League match.  He serves as captain of Daegu FC.

On 29 November 2010, he moved to Sangju Sangmu FC to fulfill his compulsory military duties.  He is expected to return to Daegu FC upon completion of his two years service in the military.

Club career statistics

Honours

Individual 
Korean FA Cup Top Scorer: 2006

External links 
 

1983 births
Living people
Association football forwards
South Korean footballers
Daegu FC players
Gimcheon Sangmu FC players
K League 1 players
Sportspeople from Daegu